Lau is a Local Government Area in Taraba State, Nigeria. Its headquarters is in the town of Lau and the area is dominated by Hausa Fulani people. Lau Local government has a border with Ardo Kola, Jalingo, Yorro and Zing local governments of Taraba state. It also shares a border with Numan, Adamawa State.

Etymology
The name of the town literally means ‘mud’ in the local Lau language.

Geography
It has an area of 1,660 km and a population of 96,590 at the 2006 census.

The postal code of the area is 662.

Languages
Local languages spoken in Lau LGA are:

fulani language
Lau Laka language, a Central Sudanic language
Lau language, a Jukunoid language

References

Local Government Areas in Taraba State